Bulgaria competed at the 1994 Winter Olympics in Lillehammer, Norway.

Competitors
The following is the list of number of competitors in the Games.

Alpine skiing

Men

Biathlon

Men

Women

Bobsleigh

Cross-country skiing

Men

Women

Figure skating

Women

Luge

Men

Short track speed skating

Women

References

Sources
Official Olympic Reports

Nations at the 1994 Winter Olympics
1994